For the "Tree Island" in Tuen Mun District, New Territories, Hong Kong, see Pak Chau.

Tree Island, also known as Zhaoshu Island, is one of the main islands of the Paracel Islands group in the South China Sea. In 1947, the Chinese named the island Zhaoshu Dao to commemorate Zhao Shu who accompanied Zheng He's expeditions in high seas (1405-1433). The area of the island is  (0.22 km²). It is under the administration of Hainan Province of China through the Zhaoshudao Village Committee. The island is also claimed by the Republic of China (Taiwan) and Vietnam.

Other names
The name Shu Dao is homologous to "Tree Island". It was coined [by the Republic of China] in 1935.
The names An Dao, Chuan'an Dao, and Chuanwan Dao, are traditionally used among the Hainanese fishermen as the island was discovered at night some centuries ago.

Tourism
The island is open to tourists. Tourists may require political examination in Haikou of Hainan Province before taking a tour there, and can hire a fishing boat from Hainan. There is beach volleyball equipment and facilities located on the island; there are also the ruins of a Chinese temple dating back to the Ming dynasty.

PRC's baselines declaration
The Declaration of the Government of the People's Republic of China on the baselines of the territorial sea (May 15, 1996): Three 3 points on Zhaoshu Dao (Tree Island) are the baseline points of the Chinese territorial sea:
Zhaoshu Dao(1) 16° 59.9' N, 112° 14.7' E
Zhaoshu Dao(2) 16° 59.7' N, 112° 15.6' E
Zhaoshu Dao(3) 16° 59.4' N, 112° 16.6' E

See also
 Paracel Islands
 North Island (北岛/đảo Bắc)
 Middle Island (中岛/đảo Trung)
 South Island (南岛/đảo Nam)
 Rocky Island (石岛/đảo Đá)
 Lincoln Island (东岛/đảo Linh Côn)
 Triton Island, (中建岛/đảo Tri Tôn)
 Bombay Reef (浪花礁/đá Bông Bay)
 North Reef (北礁/đá Bắc)

References

External links
 
Locate Zhaoshudao on GOOGLEMAP.
中华人民共和国政府关于中华人民共和国领海基线的声明(1996年5月15日).

Baselines of the Chinese territorial sea
Paracel Islands
Villages in China